Gourdon is a commune in the Lot department in south-western France.

The small town, Gourdon, close to Rocamadour, is situated in the south west region of France. Gourdon has a rich prehistoric past, and a high concentration of prehistoric sites. Gourdon is the capital of the Bouriane, the natural region part of the Quercy, which extends up to the river Dordogne and neighbours the Périgord.

Geography
The town lies in the middle of the commune, above the right bank of the Bléou, a stream tributary of the Céou, which forms most of the commune's southern border. Gourdon station has rail connections to Brive-la-Gaillarde, Cahors and Toulouse.

Climate

Population

Monuments

See also
Communes of the Lot department
Sauveterrian

References

Communes of Lot (department)
Subprefectures in France
Quercy